The Minister of Railways is the head of the Ministry of Railways of the Government of India.

List of Railway Ministers

List of Ministers of State

References

Railway Ministers of Independent India at the Indian Railways Fan Club.

External links

 
Union ministers of India
1947 establishments in India
Lists of government ministers of India